The Roads We Choose – A Retrospective is a promo compilation album released by Chris Cornell. It spans his career as a whole, featuring songs from Temple of the Dog, Soundgarden and Audioslave, as well as material from his solo career. "The Roads We Choose" was a working title for the Audioslave song "Out of Exile". It is also a title of a bonus track on Cornell's album Carry On released few months after. A number of previously unreleased acoustic versions of songs were included, but these appear to have been recorded when Cornell was still with Audioslave/Soundgarden due to those bands being credited as the recording artists.

Track listings 
 Chris Cornell - "No Such Thing" (from Carry On)
 Soundgarden - "Black Hole Sun" (from Superunknown)
 Temple of the Dog - "Hunger Strike" (from Temple of the Dog)
 Soundgarden - "Outshined" (from Badmotorfinger)
 Soundgarden - "The Day I Tried to Live" (from Superunknown)
 Soundgarden - "Fell on Black Days" (from Superunknown)
 Soundgarden - "Spoonman" (from Superunknown)
 Soundgarden - "Blow Up the Outside World" (from Down on the Upside)
 Audioslave - "Be Yourself" (from Out of Exile)
 Audioslave - "Original Fire" (acoustic)
 Audioslave - "Show Me How to Live" (from Audioslave)
 Chris Cornell - "Can't Change Me" (from Euphoria Morning)
 Temple of the Dog - "Say Hello 2 Heaven" (from Temple of the Dog)
 Audioslave - "Like a Stone" (acoustic)
 Audioslave - "Black Hole Sun" (acoustic) (b-side to "You Know My Name" by Chris Cornell, original version of song by Soundgarden)
 Chris Cornell - "You Know My Name" (from Carry On, originally appeared on the Casino Royale soundtrack)
 Chris Cornell - "Arms Around Your Love" (from Carry On)

 The three acoustic songs are taken from the Audioslave Clear Channel Stripped session in 2006.

Chris Cornell albums
2007 compilation albums
Grunge compilation albums
Interscope Records compilation albums